The 2000 CONCACAF Men's Pre-Olympic Tournament was an international football tournament that was held in the United States from 21 to 30 April 2000. The six national teams involved in the tournament were required to register a squad of eighteen players.

The age listed for each player is on 21 April 2000, the first day of the tournament. A flag is included for coaches who are of a different nationality than their own national team. Players marked in bold have been capped at full international level.

Group D

Canada
Coach:  Bruce Twamley

Honduras
Coach: Ramón Maradiaga

The 18-man final squad.

United States
Coach:  Clive Charles

The 18-man final squad was announced on 7 April 2000.

Group E

Guatemala

Mexico
Coach:  Gustavo Vargas

Panama

References

Oly
Football qualification for the 2000 Summer Olympics
2000 CONCACAF Men's Pre-Olympic Tournament